The Saint-André river (in French: rivière Saint-André) is a tributary of the Filkars River whose current flows successively into the Beaurivage River, the west bank of the Chaudière River and the south shore of the St. Lawrence River. It flows in the municipalities of Saint-Sylvestre and Sainte-Agathe-de-Lotbinière, in the Lotbinière Regional County Municipality, in the administrative region of Chaudière-Appalaches, in Québec, in Canada.

Geography 

The main neighboring watersheds of the Saint-André river are:
 north side: Fourchette River, Filkars River, Beaurivage River;
 east side: Beaurivage River, Nadeau River, Lessard River, Vallée River, Boiler River;
 south side: Filkars River, Palmer River, Palmer East River;
 west side: Armagh River, Saint-Georges River, rivière du Chêne, Henri River.

This headland is located south of route 216, north of Mont Handkerchief and south of the village of Saint-Patrice-de-Beaurivage.

From its source, the Saint-André River flows over  divided into the following segments:
  towards the southwest, in Saint-Sylvestre, to the confluence of a stream (coming from the west);
  northwesterly, to route 269;
  towards the northeast, up to its confluence.

The Saint-André river empties on the south bank of the Filkars River in the eastern part of the territory of Sainte-Agathe-de-Lotbinière.

Toponymy 
The toponym "rivière Saint-André" was formalized on December 5, 1968, at the Commission de toponymie du Québec.

See also 

 List of rivers of Quebec

References 

Rivers of Chaudière-Appalaches
Lotbinière Regional County Municipality